Chloroclystis laetitia is a moth species in the family Geometridae first described by Louis Beethoven Prout in 1937. It is found on São Tomé Island.

References

Moths described in 1937
laetitia
Moths of São Tomé and Príncipe
Taxa named by Louis Beethoven Prout